Soda Springs is a city in Caribou County, Idaho, United States. Its population was 3,058 at the time of the 2010 census. The city has been the county seat of Caribou County since the county was organized in 1919. In the 1860s, Soda Springs served as the seat of Oneida County.

History
The city is named for the hundreds of natural springs of carbonated water that are located in and around the city. The springs were known to Native Americans, and were a landmark along the Oregon Trail in the middle 19th century. Today the city is also known as the location of the Soda Springs Geyser, which was unleashed in 1934 when town fathers were seeking hot water for a hot pool bathing attraction. They drilled into a chamber of highly pressurized carbon dioxide gas and cold water, and the geyser was released. After running for weeks and flooding the downtown area, it was capped and manually released upon request as a tourist attraction. Currently a timed release valve opens every hour on the hour. Its height and volume have not decreased after many years. Viewing platforms are located at either end of the travertine mound where the geyser erupts. Interpretive signs are located on the platforms explaining this phenomenon.

Soda Springs is also the location of one of the Ground Observer Corps sites.

Geography

Soda Springs experiences a continental climate (Köppen Dfb) with long, cold, snowy winters and cool summers.
<div style="width:65%">

</div style>

Demographics

2010 census
As of the census of 2010, there were 3,058 people, 1,204 households, and 830 families living in the city. The racial makeup of the city was 96.4% White, 0.1% African American, 0.3% Native American, 0.3% Asian, 0.4% Pacific Islander, 1.4% from other races, and 1.2% from two or more races. Hispanic or Latino people of any race were 3.4% of the population.

There were 1,204 households, of which 33.4% had children under the age of 18 living with them, 56.9% were married couples living together, 8.4% had a female householder with no husband present, 3.7% had a male householder with no wife present, and 31.1% were non-families. 28.2% of all households were made up of individuals, and 12.5% had someone living alone who was 65 years of age or older. The average household size was 2.47 and the average family size was 3.03.

The median age in the city was 37.8 years. 27.4% of residents were under the age of 18; 7.1% were between the ages of 18 and 24; 22.9% were from 25 to 44; 26.2% were from 45 to 64; and 16.4% were 65 years of age or older. The gender makeup of the city was 49.7% male and 50.3% female.

2000 census
As of the census of 2000, there were 3,381 people, 1,210 households, and 905 families living in the city. The racial makeup of the city was 96.63% White, 0.03% African American, 0.09% Native American, 0.15% Asian, 0.21% Pacific Islander, 1.18% from other races, and 1.72% from two or more races. Hispanic or Latino people of any race were 2.90% of the population.

There were 1,210 households, out of which 40.7% had children under the age of 18 living with them, 66.1% were married couples living together, 6.5% had a female householder with no husband present, and 25.2% were non-families. 22.1% of all households were made up of individuals, and 9.3% had someone living alone who was 65 years of age or older. The average household size was 2.74 and the average family size was 3.24.

In the city, the population was spread out, with 30.8% under the age of 18, 9.5% from 18 to 24, 26.0% from 25 to 44, 20.1% from 45 to 64, and 13.5% who were 65 years of age or older. The median age was 34 years. For every 100 females, there were 95.2 males. For every 100 females age 18 and over, there were 97.3 males.

The median income for a household in the city was $40,690, and the median income for a family was $46,152. Males had a median income of $41,979 versus $21,250 for females. The per capita income for the city was $15,729. About 7.0% of families and 9.3% of the population were below the poverty line, including 8.5% of those under age 18 and 8.7% of those age 65 or over.

Notable people

 David Archer, former National Football League quarterback
 Vic Baltzell, former National Football League fullback
 Reed Budge, Idaho legislator

See also
 Crystal Geyser
 List of geysers

References

External links
 
 Soda Springs Chamber of Commerce website
 City of Soda Springs portal

Cities in Caribou County, Idaho
Cities in Idaho
Oregon Trail
County seats in Idaho